Kaali may refer to:

 Kali or Kaali, Hindu goddess
Kaali, Estonia, village in Saaremaa Parish, Saare County, Estonia
Kaali crater, group of meteorite craters in Kaali
4227 Kaali, asteroid, named after Kaali crater
Kaali (1980 film), an Indian film by I. V. Sasi shot simultaneously in Tamil and Telugu
 Kaali – Ek Agnipariksha; Indian TV series (2010–2011)
 Kaali – Ek Punar Avatar; Indian TV series (2012–2013)
 Kaali (2018 film), 2018 Indian Tamil-language film by Kiruthiga Udhayanidhi

See also
Kali (disambiguation)